Congo's Caper is a side-scrolling platform action video game developed and published for the Super NES by Data East. The game was released in Japan in 1992. A North American version was released in May 1993. It was later released on the Nintendo Switch via the Nintendo Switch Online service on May 26, 2022.

Gameplay
The plot of Congo's Caper involves a half-human, half-monkey boy named Congo, who sets out on a quest to rescue his girlfriend after she is abducted by a demon. The player controls Congo. Congo's Caper is played across 35 levels that take place in multiple worlds, including a jungle, a mountain range, a pirate ship, a volcano, and a ghost town. The bosses include the demon, a T-Rex, a ninja, a pirate, a mad scientist, and a vampire. If Congo is hit by an enemy, he reverts to his monkey form. If Congo is hit again, the player loses a life.

Reception 

Nintendo Power praised the game's graphics, controls, password feature, and variety of levels, but wrote: "The game doesn't really do anything that Super Mario World and countless other games have done just as well". AllGame rated Congo's Caper three and a half stars out of five. Power Unlimited gave the game a score of 80% writing: "Congo's Caper is a fun, varied platform game. Yet it is not a game that will be remembered by anyone as a seasoning. The controls are too stiff for that, and the levels are too easy for that.

Notes

References

External links
 Congo's Caper at MobyGames
 Congo's Capers at IGN
 Congo's Caper at GameFAQs

1992 video games
Action video games
Data East video games
Fictional monkeys
Nintendo Switch Online games
Super Nintendo Entertainment System games
Super Nintendo Entertainment System-only games
Video game sequels
Video games about primates
Video games developed in Japan
Video games set in prehistory
Prehistoric people in popular culture
Single-player video games
Dinosaurs in video games

ja:戦え原始人#戦え原始人2 ルーキーの冒険